On July 28, 1945, a B-25 Mitchell bomber of the United States Army Air Forces crashed into the north side of the Empire State Building in New York City, while flying in thick fog. The accident killed fourteen people (three crewmen and eleven people in the building), and an estimated twenty-four others were injured.

Incident 
On Saturday, July 28, 1945, Lieutenant Colonel William Franklin Smith Jr., of Watertown, Massachusetts, was piloting a B-25 Mitchell bomber on a routine personnel transport mission from Bedford Army Air Field in Massachusetts to Newark Metropolitan Airport in New Jersey. Smith asked for clearance to land, but he was advised of zero visibility. Proceeding anyway, he became disoriented by the fog and turned right instead of left after passing the Chrysler Building.

At 9:40 a.m., the aircraft crashed into the north side of the Empire State Building, between the 78th and 80th floors, making an  hole in the building into the offices of the War Relief Services and the National Catholic Welfare Council. One engine shot through the south side opposite the impact, flew as far as the next block, dropped , landed on the roof of a nearby building and caused a fire that destroyed a penthouse art studio. The other engine and part of the landing gear fell down an elevator shaft. The resulting fire was extinguished in 40 minutes. The Empire State Building fire is the highest structural fire to be brought under control by firefighters.

Between 50 and 60 sightseers were on the 86th floor observation deck when the crash happened. Fourteen people were killed: Colonel Smith, Staff Sergeant Christopher Domitrovich, and Navy Aviation Machinist's Mate Albert Perna, who was hitching a ride, and eleven civilians in the building. Perna's body was not found until two days later, when search crews discovered that it had entered an elevator shaft and fallen to the bottom. The other two crewmen were burned beyond recognition. Approximately twenty to twenty-four others were injured as a result of the crash. Elevator operator Betty Lou Oliver was thrown from her elevator car on the 80th floor and suffered severe burns. First aid workers placed her on another elevator car to transport her to the ground floor, but the cables supporting that elevator had been damaged in the incident, and it fell 75 stories, ending up in the basement. Oliver survived the fall due to the softening cushion of air created by the falling elevator car within this elevator shaft, however she suffered a broken pelvis, back and neck when rescuers found her amongst the rubble. This remains the world record for the longest survived elevator fall.

Aftermath 
Despite the damage and deaths, the building was open for business on many floors on the next Monday morning, less than 48 hours later. The crash spurred the passage of the long-pending Federal Tort Claims Act, which was signed into law by President Harry S. Truman in August 1946, initiating retroactive provisions into the law and allowing people to sue the government for the accident.

After the debris had been cleared away, Armand Hammer purchased the damaged 78th floor, refurbished it, and made it the headquarters of his United Distillers of America.

On July 24, 1946, four days before the first anniversary of the crash, another aircraft narrowly missed striking the building. The unidentified twin-engine plane, described as baring no military insignia, flew past the 68th floor and scraped the observation deck, startling workers and tourists there.

The events of the crash were the subject of an episode of the History channel documentary Disasters of the Century, entitled "It Came from the Sky". The documentary was made in 2001.

See also
 1946 40 Wall Street Plane crash
 El Al Flight 1862
 September 11 attacks
 2002 Tampa airplane crash
 2002 Pirelli Tower airplane crash
 2005 Iranian Air Force C-130 crash
 2006 New York City plane crash
 2010 Austin suicide attack
 2014 Wichita King Air crash
 Skyscraper fire

References

External links
 On This Day in Aviation History: July 28th – NYCAviation
 
 Bomber Crash into Empire State Building, engineering case study calculating the impact force of the bomber (Archived from the original on 2004-07-15. Retrieved 2016-06-26.)
 
 Empire State Crash – Video produced by the PBS Series History Detectives

Empire State Building B-25 crash
Accidents and incidents involving military aircraft
Aviation accidents and incidents in New York City
Empire State Building B-25 crash
Aviation accidents and incidents involving fog
Building and structure fires in New York City
Commercial building fires
1945 B-25 crash
Empire State Building B-25 crash
High-rise fires